The Four Perils are four malevolent beings that existed in Chinese mythology and the antagonistic counterparts of the Four Benevolent Animals.

Book of Documents
In the Book of Documents, they are defined as the "Four Criminals":

 Gonggong (the disastrous god;
 Huandou (a.k.a.), a chimeric minister and/or nation from the south who conspired with Gonggong against Emperor Yao
 Gun, whose poorly-built dam released a destructive flood and whose son was Yu the Great;
 Sanmiao, the tribes that attacked Emperor Yao's tribe.

Zuo Zhuan, Shanhaijing, and Shenyijing
In Zuo Zhuan, Shanhaijing, and Shenyijing, the Four Perils (Hanzi: 四凶; pinyin: Sì Xiōng) are defined as:

 the Hundun, a yellow winged creature of chaos with six legs and no face;
 the Qiongqi, a monstrous creature that eats people, considered the same in Japan as Kamaitachi;
 the Taowu, a reckless, stubborn creature;
 the Taotie, a gluttonous beast.

Identification
Zhang Shoujie's Correct Meanings of the Record of the Grand Historian identifies Huandou (讙兠) with Hundun (渾沌), Gonggong (共工) with Qiongqi (窮竒), Gun (鯀) with Taowu (檮杌), and the Sanmiao "Three Miao" (三苗) with Taotie (饕餮).

In popular culture
The four perils are featured in the popular Japanese anime A Certain Scientific Accelerator.
In Yashahime: Princess Half-Demon, the Four Perils are the demon group crossed over the mainland during Spring and Autumn period. The members are Konton, Tōtetsu, Kyūki, and Tōkotsu which led by the Beast King of the Eastern Lands Kirinmaru.
In Pokémon Scarlet and Violet, the four legendary Pokémon Ting-Lu, Chien-Pao, Wo-Chien, and Chi-Yu are primarily inspired by the four perils.

See also
 Four Barbarians

Notes

References

 
Chinese legendary creatures
Chinese mythology
Evil deities